Krull is a surname originating from Prussian nobility.

People
Alexander Krull (born 1970), German singer
Annie Krull (1876–1947), German operatic soprano
Germaine Krull (1897–1985), photographer
Hasso Krull (born 1964), Estonian poet, literary and cultural critic and translator
Jake Krull (1938–2016), American politician
Kathleen Krull (born 1952), American author of children's books
Lucas Krull (born 1998), American football player
Reinhard Krull (born 1954), West German field hockey player
Suzanne Krull (born 1966), American actress
Wolfgang Krull, German mathematician, who was responsible for the development of numerous mathematical concepts:
Krull dimension
Krull's principal ideal theorem
Krull's theorem
Krull–Akizuki theorem
Krull–Schmidt theorem
 Krull topology, an example of the profinite group
 Krull's intersection, a theorem within algebraic ring theory that describes the behaviors of certain local rings

In fiction and the arts
 Krull (film), a 1983 heroic fantasy film
 Krull (video game), the arcade, Atari and pinball adaptations of that film
 Felix Krull, the title character in Confessions of Felix Krull
 Krull, a country in the fictional Discworld